Edward L. Keyes (circa 1812-June 6, 1859) represented Dedham, Massachusetts in the Great and General Court in both the House of Representatives and the Senate. He also served on the Massachusetts Governor's Council and in the Constitutional Convention of 1853.

Personal life
Keyes was born to Dr. Justus and Betsey ( Brooks) Keyes. He was the great-grandson of Governor John Brooks.

He had only a common school education with one or two terms at an academy. He had a keen taste for literature, and his youthful ambition led him to employ his leisure time in the acquisition of knowledge. He distinguished himself in the Lyceums and was regarded as a brilliant youth. He went to Boston as a clerk in a wholesale store, and availed himself of the facilities for acquiring knowledge so abundantly afforded by that city.

He is buried in the Brooks tomb in Medford, Massachusetts.

Career
While in Boston, Keyes wrote articles for the daily papers. He took a leading part in the formation of the Free Soil Party. In 1844, he bought the printing establishment of the Dedham Gazette.

He died from softening of the brain, in the hospital in Taunton, Massachusetts on June 6, 1859, at the age of 47. He represented Dedham for two years in the House of Representatives. In 1851 and 1852 he represented the County of Norfolk in the State Senate. In 1848, he was a member of the Executive Council, and in 1853, represented the town of Abington, Massachusetts in the Constitutional Convention. He was also one of the Commissioners for the erection of the State Alms Houses. For several years, "Keyes was one of the foremost young men of the Massachusetts."

References

Works cited

Members of the Massachusetts House of Representatives
Year of birth unknown
1859 deaths
People from Abington, Massachusetts
Massachusetts state senators
Members of the Massachusetts Governor's Council